Wonder Woman Golden Lasso Coaster is a steel roller coaster at Six Flags Fiesta Texas, built by Rocky Mountain Construction and opened on May 12, 2018. The roller coaster is themed to the DC Comics character, Wonder Woman. It was one of two prototype single-rail coasters to open in 2018, the other being RailBlazer at California's Great America, which has a mirror-image layout to the Wonder Woman Golden Lasso Coaster.

History 
Six Flags Fiesta Texas announced the closure of Power Surge in mid-summer 2017. Power Surge was closed on July 23, 2017. The park began teasing a new attraction for the 2018 season and on August 3, 2017, the park officially announced a first of its kind roller coaster, introducing the new Rocky Mountain Construction single-rail coaster concept.

The roller coaster was originally planned to open on March 10, 2018, with a soft opening a week prior for an added bonus to the park's inaugural Botánica Music Festival. However, it was delayed twice until opening in May.

Ride experience 

The train then rises up to the left into an airtime hill and then drop again, entering a hill followed by several turns. After the turns it drops and turns into a cutback, followed by a corkscrew. The train finally goes through an over-banked turn to the right before hitting the brake run.

References

External links
 
 
 Wonder Woman Golden Lasso Coaster at Rocky Mountain Construction

Six Flags Fiesta Texas
Roller coasters operated by Six Flags
Roller coasters in Texas
Roller coasters introduced in 2018
Single-rail roller coasters